The 2017 NAIA Division I women's basketball tournament was the tournament held by the NAIA to determine the national champion of women's college basketball among its Division I members in the United States and Canada for the 2016–17 basketball season.

Oklahoma City defeated Lewis–Clark State in the championship game, 73–66, to claim the Stars' ninth NAIA national title.

The tournament was played at the Rimrock Auto Arena at MetraPark in Billings, Montana.

Qualification

The tournament field remained fixed at thirty-two teams, which were sorted into four quadrants of eight teams each. Within each quadrant, teams were seeded sequentially from one to eight based on record and season performance.

The tournament continued to utilize a simple single-elimination format.

Bracket

See also
2017 NAIA Division I men's basketball tournament
2017 NCAA Division I women's basketball tournament
2017 NCAA Division II women's basketball tournament
2017 NCAA Division III women's basketball tournament
2017 NAIA Division II women's basketball tournament

References

NAIA
NAIA Women's Basketball Championships
2017 in sports in Montana